Welcome to Acapulco is a 2019 Mexican action comedy thriller film directed by Guillermo Iván and starring Michael Kingsbaker, Ana Serradilla, Michael Madsen, Paul Sorvino, William Baldwin, Bradley Gregg, Jeannine Kaspar and Michael Papajohn.

Plot

Matt has to become a real-life version of the video-game characters he designs to evade an awkward situation he's put himself in after a wild night.

Video game designer Matt Booth has one shot to save his career by unveiling his biggest project yet at the Video Game Awards in New Mexico. But after running into a friend at the airport and having a little too much to drink before his flight, he ends up in ACTUAL Mexico - specifically, Acapulco. As soon as he lands, he finds himself on the run from high-powered criminals, deadly hitmen and the Feds, all looking for a mysterious package that he has allegedly smuggled through customs yet knows nothing about. Partnering with a badass, beautiful femme fatale and channeling his inner video game action hero, the pair unravels a conspiracy that could shake the foundation of the United States, maybe even the world.

Cast
 Ana Serradilla as Adriana Vazquez
 Michael Kingsbaker as Mathew Booth
 Michael Madsen as Hyde
 Paul Sorvino as Senator Campbell
 William Baldwin as Drake Savage
 Bradley Gregg as Anthony
 Jeannine Kaspar as Miss Ryker
 Michael Papajohn as "Apex"
 Guillermo Iván as Raphael

References

External links
 
 

2019 films
2010s English-language films
2010s Spanish-language films
Mexican action comedy films
Mexican comedy thriller films
2019 action comedy films
2010s comedy thriller films
2019 multilingual films
Mexican multilingual films
2010s Mexican films